Eskilsø is a small Danish island located in the Roskilde fjord, Frederikssund Municipality, northern Zealand. 

In the 12th century, there was an Augustinian monastery on the island. The ruins of the monastery church are still visible.

References

Islands of Denmark
Geography of Frederikssund Municipality